Frank Butner Anderson (June 16, 1882 – November 8, 1966) was an American college football, and baseball coach as well as athletic director. He was the first football and baseball coach in the history of Oglethorpe University and the namesake of its baseball field. The field was dedicated as such on May 11, 1963.  Anderson was inducted into the Oglethorpe Athletic Hall of Fame, a member of its inaugural class of 1962. He always wore his baseball uniform to practice and to games. He is known by some as the "Dean of Southern Baseball Coaches." Frank is the father of Alf Anderson.

Early years
Frank Anderson was born on June 16, 1882, on a family farm near Powder Springs in Cobb County, Georgia.

University of Georgia
In 1900 he enrolled at the University of Georgia (UGA) in Athens. He played three years of varsity baseball and was All-Southern second baseman in 1903 and 1904, when he captained the team. He once hit a two out, ninth inning home run to tie rival Georgia Tech. Anderson played in the backfield on Georgia's football team. He also was a star on the Track and Field team and held the UGA record in the 220 and 440 for 30 years.

Coaching years

Prep school
After university, Anderson began teaching mathematics and coaching baseball at various high schools around Atlanta, Georgia. He won a state championship with the University School for Boys at Stone Mountain, Georgia in his first year. He also assisted the football team as an assistant under former Clemson player Hope Sadler. He also coached at the Robert E Lee Institute of Thomaston, Georgia and at the Gordon Military Institute.

Georgia
Anderson returned to Georgia to coach his alma mater's baseball teams from 1910 to 1913. He won consecutive Southern Intercollegiate Athletic Association championships in 1911 and 1912.

Oglethorpe
Anderson established the football and baseball programs for Oglethorpe University in 1917. He was the football coach until 1919. He was the baseball coach until 1944.  Amongst his baseball players were Luke Appling and Jay Partridge.

Head coaching record

College football

References

External links
 

1882 births
1966 deaths
Baseball second basemen
Georgia Bulldogs baseball coaches
Georgia Bulldogs baseball players
Georgia Bulldogs football coaches
Oglethorpe Stormy Petrels baseball coaches
Oglethorpe Stormy Petrels football coaches
Oglethorpe University faculty
High school baseball coaches in the United States
High school football coaches in Georgia (U.S. state)
People from Douglasville, Georgia
Sportspeople from the Atlanta metropolitan area
Coaches of American football from Georgia (U.S. state)
Players of American football from Georgia (U.S. state)
Baseball coaches from Georgia (U.S. state)
Baseball players from Georgia (U.S. state)